Carter Farm, also known as "Everbreeze," is a historic house and farm located near West Liberty, Ohio County, West Virginia. The main house was built between 1848 and 1852, and is a -story brick residence in the Greek Revival style. It features a hipped roof and symmetrical facade.  The original portico was replaced in 1946.  Also on the property are a one-story, gabled-roof masonry slave quarters; a masonry, outdoor detached kitchen; the "Wool House," built in 1819; and a large, -story barn.

It was listed on the National Register of Historic Places in 1983.

References

Houses on the National Register of Historic Places in West Virginia
Greek Revival houses in West Virginia
Houses completed in 1852
Houses in Ohio County, West Virginia
National Register of Historic Places in Ohio County, West Virginia
Farms on the National Register of Historic Places in West Virginia
1852 establishments in Virginia
Slave cabins and quarters in the United States